Eastern Institute for Integrated Learning in Management Kolkata or EIILM-Kolkata is an education institute in Kolkata, India. It was founded in 1995 and is affiliated with Vidyasagar University, Raiganj University, and Maulana Abul Kalam Azad University of Technology.

EIILM-Kolkata is also a partner with Mingdao University (Taiwan), Rajamangala University of Technology (Thailand), Pathumthani University (Thailand), and 16 other Indonesian Universities.

In 2019, The Dun & Bradstreet Corporation called it one of the leading Business Schools in India. On 3 November 2022, it organised the Trans Asian Marketing Conclave in Bangkok, Thailand. EIILM-Kolkata also organised the charity match between the All-Stars Team of FC Bayern Munich Club and the ex-players of East Bengal Football Club. It annually conducts its cultural event called Apavrinu-Vayam.

Courses

The institute offers various management courses:

MBA
BBA
BBA in Hospital Management
BBA in Hotel & Hospitality Management
B.Sc. in Media Management
BCA
BBA in Business Analytics
Ph.D. as per UGC norms

References

Business schools in Kolkata